Lyngen (also known as , , or ) is a fjord in Troms og Finnmark county, Norway. The fjord is located within the municipalities of Skjervøy, Nordreisa, Lyngen, Gáivuotna–Kåfjord, and Storfjord. It stretches from the village of Hatteng in Storfjord Municipality in the south all the way north to the islands of Skjervøy Municipality. The Lyngen Alps lie along the western shore of the fjord and the European route E06 highway runs along the eastern shore. The Kåfjorden branches off of the main fjord on the east side, and the southernmost part of the fjord is also known as the Storfjorden.

Media gallery

See also
 List of Norwegian fjords

References

External links

Visit Lyngenfjord

Fjords of Troms og Finnmark
Lyngen
Skjervøy
Nordreisa
Gáivuotna–Kåfjord
Storfjord